Charles Langhorne "Chuck" Carrington  (born May 24, 1968, Lynchburg, Virginia) is an American actor best known for playing Petty Officer Jason Tiner on JAG, and also starred as Renny Jacobsen in the independent feature thriller The List, alongside Malcolm McDowell and Hilarie Burton.

Filmography
The List (2007) .... Renny Jacobsen
Surface (TV) (1 episode) (2005) .... Naval Attache
JAG (TV) (102 episodes) (1997–2003) .... Petty Officer Jason Tiner
Grosse Pointe (TV) (Prelude to a Kiss) (2000) .... Groom
Beyond Belief: Fact or Fiction (TV) (Epitaph) (2000) .... Groom
Melrose Place (TV) (No Time for Sperm Banks) (1997) .... Fireman

References

1968 births
Date of birth missing (living people)
American male film actors
American male television actors
Male actors from Virginia
People from Lynchburg, Virginia
Living people